Acacia flavipila is a shrub of the genus Acacia and the subgenus Plurinerves that is endemic to an area of south western Australia.

Description
Like most species of Acacia it has phyllodes rather than true leaves. It blooms from May to September and produces yellow flowers.

Taxonomy
There are two recognised varieties of the species:
Acacia flavipila var. flavipila
Acacia flavipila var. ovalis

Distribution
It is native to an area in the Wheatbelt and Goldfields-Esperance regions of Western Australia where it is commonly situated on undulating plains growing sandy or clay-loam soils.

See also
List of Acacia species

References

flavipila
Acacias of Western Australia
Taxa named by Alex George
Plants described in 1966